Sujatha is a 1953 Sri Lankan romantic musical film based on the Bollywood film Bari Behen. It was the most successful Sri Lankan film made up to that time.

Plot summary 
The protagonist Sujatha abandons her studies to provide for her young sister Prema after the death of their mother. Their mother had always wanted to secure a good education for Prema and Sujatha sees it fitting to make this sacrifice. When Prema heads to the city however, she is seduced and impregnated by a smooth talking womanizer named Wickie. Wickie dumps Prema who then returns to live with her older sister. They find solace in a caring doctor named Nihal who comes to fall in love with Sujatha.

Cast 
 Florida Jayalath as Sujatha
 Prem Jayanth as Nihal
 Shanthi Lekha as Prema
 Dommie Jayawardena as Wickie
 Jemini Kantha as Emily
 David Dharmakeerthi as Mudali
 Bertram Fernando as Perera
 Sunil Premadasa
 Nona Subeida
 Mohideen Baig as Singer
 S. D. Elizabeth
 M. P. Gilman

Songs 
"Premalookaya Niwee" – K. Jamuna Rani and Mohideen Baig,(lyrics by D. T. Fernando)
"Sumadhura Wey" – K. Rani
"Ayyo Baa Baa" – Sunil Premadasa, K. Rani and Dharmadasa Walpola
"Menna Meniko" – Dommie Jayawardena and Swarnalatha
"Wedena Harede Nage" – K. Jamuna Rani
"Pem Rella Nage" – K. Rani and Dharmadasa Walpola,(lyrics by D. T. Fernando)
"Mayawen Mey Loke (Kroodya Dey)" – Mohideen Baig
"Prema Gange" – K. Rani and Mohideen Baig, (lyrics by D. T. Fernando)
"Manaranjana Darshaniya Lanka" – K. Rani and chorus
"Danne Kale" – Swarnalatha and Bertrum Fernando
"Narilatha Pushpa" – Mohideen Baig
"Giya Thamayi" – Swarnalatha and Bertrum Fernando (melody from Lata Mangeshkar's "Chori Chori Meri Gali" in 1952 Bollywood film Jaal)

References 

1950s romantic musical films
1953 films
Films scored by Susarla Dakshinamurthi
Remakes of Sri Lankan films
Sri Lankan black-and-white films
Sri Lankan romance films